The 1994 St Albans City and District Council election took place on 5 May 1994 to elect members of St Albans City and District Council in England. This was on the same day as other local elections.

Election result

Ward results

Ashley

 
 

 

No Green candidate as previous (3.1%).

Batchwood

 
 

 

No Green candidate as previous (4.5%).

Clarence

Colney Heath

Cunningham

Harpenden East

Harpenden North

Harpenden South

Harpenden West

London Colney

Marshallwick North

Marshallwick South

Park Street

Redbourn

 
 

 

No Conservative candidate as previous (51.9%).

Sopwell

St. Peters

St. Stephens

Verulam

Wheathampstead

References

1994 English local elections
1994
May 1994 events in the United Kingdom